Asomatos is the name of several towns in Cyprus and Greece  :

Asomatos, Crete, a village in Greece
Asomatos, Kyrenia, a Maronite village in the Kyrenia District of Cyprus
Asomatos, Limassol, a village in the Limassol District of Cyprus